Winter Haven or Winterhaven may refer to:
 Winterhaven, California, in Imperial County
 Winterhaven Village, California, in El Dorado County
 Winter Haven, Florida
 Winter Haven High School
 Winter Haven Red Sox
 Winter Haven's Gilbert Airport
 Winter Haven Super Sox
 Winter Haven Area Transit
 Winter Haven (Amtrak station)
 Winter Haven Heights Historic Residential District
 "Winter Haven", the eighth track on the 2010 album Festival by Jon Oliva's Pain